André F. Richard (December 16, 1906 – May 13, 1993) was a Canadian politician. He served in the Legislative Assembly of New Brunswick from 1957 to 1974 as member of the Liberal party.

References

1906 births
1993 deaths